Statistics of Swedish football Division 3 for the 1998 season.

League standings

Norra Norrland 1998

Mellersta Norrland 1998

Södra Norrland 1998

Norra Svealand 1998

Östra Svealand 1998

Västra Svealand 1998

Nordöstra Götaland 1998

Nordvästra Götaland 1998

Mellersta Götaland 1998

Sydöstra Götaland 1998

Sydvästra Götaland 1998

Södra Götaland 1998

Footnotes

References 

Swedish Football Division 3 seasons
4
Sweden
Sweden